Sérgio Vieira may refer to:

Sérgio Vieira (football manager) (born 1983), Portuguese football manager
Sérgio Vieira (racewalker) (born 1976), Portuguese race walker
Sérgio Vieira de Mello (1948–2003), Brazilian diplomat